Ángel Madrazo Ruiz (born 30 July 1988) is a Spanish professional road racing cyclist who rides for UCI ProTeam .

In August 2016  announced that Madrazo would join them for the 2017 and 2018 seasons.

Major results

2008
 8th Overall Circuito Montañés
1st Stage 5
2011
 5th GP Miguel Induráin
 5th Prueba Villafranca de Ordizia
2012
 3rd GP Miguel Induráin
 5th Overall Tour Méditerranéen
 5th Klasika Primavera
 6th Tre Valli Varesine
2013
 Tour of Britain
1st  Sprints classification
1st  Mountains classification
 2nd Prueba Villafranca de Ordizia
2014
 2nd Giro dell'Emilia
 8th Overall Tour du Gévaudan Languedoc-Roussillon
1st  Mountains classification
2015
 1st Prueba Villafranca de Ordizia
 1st  Mountains classification Tour du Gévaudan Languedoc-Roussillon
 3rd Giro dell'Emilia
 7th Circuito de Getxo
  Combativity award Stages 8 & 18 Vuelta a España
2016
 1st Stage 4 Étoile de Bessèges
 2nd Prueba Villafranca de Ordizia
 4th Circuito de Getxo
 7th Overall Vuelta a Asturias
2017
 1st Mountains classification Circuit de la Sarthe
 2nd Circuito de Getxo
 9th Overall Tour of Austria
2018
 7th Overall Tour of Austria
 7th Tour du Gévaudan Occitanie
 8th Overall Vuelta a Aragón
 8th Overall Tour of Almaty
2019
 Vuelta a España
1st Stage 5
Held  after Stages 2–15
 Combativity award Stages 2, 3 & 16
 6th Overall Troféu Joaquim Agostinho
2021 
 2nd Vuelta a Murcia
  Combativity award Stage 4 Vuelta a España
2022
 4th Overall Tour du Rwanda

Grand Tour general classification results timeline

References

External links 

 
 
 

1988 births
Living people
Sportspeople from Santander, Spain
Cyclists from Cantabria
Spanish male cyclists
Spanish Vuelta a España stage winners